Obshchina is a rural locality (a village) in Dmitriyevsky Selsoviet, Blagovarsky District, Bashkortostan, Russia. The population was 69 as of 2010. There is 1 street.

Geography 
Obshchina is located 55 km northwest of Yazykovo (the district's administrative centre) by road. 6-ye Alkino is the nearest rural locality.

References 

Rural localities in Blagovarsky District